Boingo may refer to:

 Boingo (album), a 1994 music album by Oingo Boingo
 BOI-NGO, a 1987 music album by Oingo Boingo
 Boingo Wireless, an American wireless communication services provider